Subaru is a Japanese automobile brand of Subaru Corporation. 

Subaru may also refer to:

 Subaru Corporation
 Subaru (literary magazine), published in Japan from 1909 to 1913
 Subaru (name), a Japanese given name
 Subaru (telescope), a telescope in Hawaii operated by the National Astronomical Observatory of Japan
 A Japanese term for the Pleiades

See also
 Subartu, an ancient region in Upper Mesopotamia